James M. Dolliver (March 3, 1818September 4, 1896) was a 19th-century American Boston maritime pilot. During his pilot service he served on the pilot boats Lillie, Friend, and Louisa Jane. Dolliver was one of the oldest of the Boston pilots at the time of his death. He died on September 4, 1896, in Provincetown, Massachusetts.

Early life

James M. Dolliver was born in Boston, Massachusetts on March 3, 1818. He was the son of Pilot  Thomas G Dolliver and Mary B. Emerson. He married Mary A. Longhurst on April 26, 1860 in Boston and had four children. His son, Watson Shields Dolliver was also a Boston pilot.

Career

Dolliver was one of the oldest of the Boston pilots, having received his pilots' commission in 1841, at the age of 23. He was skilled with steamship lines, being able to navigate them in and out of the Boston Harbor.

During the American Civil War he served as a Boarding officer for the Boston Custom House under Collector Russell. He also served as a pilot of the old state school ship Massachusetts under Captain Matthews.

Dolliver was the general manager of a diplomatic trip with Anson Burlingame to tour United States with the Chinese embassy in June 1868.

During his pilot service Dolliver served on the pilot boats Lillie, Friend, and Louisa Jane.

Lillie

The Boston pilot boat Lillie was launched on May 20, 1876 by Pierce, Montgomery & Howard for Boston pilots. She was designed by model by Dennison J. Lawlor. On September 12, 1884, the pilot-boat Lillie, No. 1 was sold to Captain Dolliver. The price that was paid was $8,000.

Friend

The Boston pilot Boat Friend was launched on May 5, 1847 by Daniel D. Kelley & Holmes shipyard for Boston pilots.

On February 2, 1859, Dolliver and Patrick Henry Chandler were on the Friend, when they rescued the captain of the British schooner Caroline that went ashore on the rocks near the Boston Light in heavy weather while approaching Boston. They received a silver medal from the Massachusetts Humane Society for their brave efforts.

He was friends with the American romantic poet James Russell Lowell, who paid tribute to Dolliver in a letter he wrote in June 1859, to his friend Charles Eliot Norton, an American author, social critic, and professor of art. Lowell wrote that he had been down the Boston harbor on the pilot boat Friend with Captain Dolliver.

Louisa Jane

Dolliver was on the pilot boat  Louisa Jane, No. 7, on November 28, 1876 during a storm. He anchored in Plymouth outer harbor. She broke away at night and went ashore on the flats. Dolliver was able to get her floated and sailed to the Town dock without damage.

On August 23, 1884, Captain James M. Dolliver was on the pilot boat Louisa Jane, No. 5, went she went ashore on the rocks. Dolliver got her afloat and a tug boat brought them back to Boston for repairs.

Dolliver retired from active pilot service in 1886 and moved to Provincetown, Massachusetts. He was a member of the Boston Pilots' Relief Association.

Death

Captain Dolliver died, at age 78, September 4, 1896 in Provincetown, Massachusetts. The funeral services were held at the Mount Auburn Chapel in Cambridge, Massachusetts. The flag of the Pilots' Association at the end of Lewis wharf office was set at half-mast. The funeral was attended by a large delegation of Boston pilots. He was buried at the Mount Auburn Cemetery in Massachusetts.

See also
 List of Northeastern U. S. Pilot Boats

References

1818 births
1896 deaths
People from Massachusetts
Maritime pilotage
Sea captains